Aleksandra Kustova  (born 26 August 1998) is a Russian ski jumper.

She competed at the 2018 Winter Olympics.

References

External links
 
 

1998 births
Living people
Russian female ski jumpers
Ski jumpers at the 2018 Winter Olympics
Ski jumpers at the 2022 Winter Olympics
Olympic ski jumpers of Russia